The Ministry of Supervision of the People's Republic of China (MOS) was a Cabinet-level department of the State Council responsible for maintaining an efficient, disciplined, clean and honest government, and educate public servants about their duty and discipline. Many of its operations were merged with the Central Commission for Discipline Inspection of the Chinese Communist Party in 1993, meaning that the two institutions were effectively combined into a single body with mostly overlapping staff and jurisdiction. On 13 March 2018 it was dissolved and merged into the National Supervisory Commission.

History 
The Ministry of Supervision was established as the People's Supervisory Commission in October 1949 after the founding of the People's Republic of China. It took on the present name Ministry of Supervision in September 1954. The ministry was abolished in April 1959. The ministry was reestablished in July 1987 by the Sixth National People's Congress. This led to successive local supervisory authorities being created at the provincial and local levels. On May 9, 1997, the Ministry of Supervision was legislated to enforce the Law of the People's Republic of China on Administration Supervision of the government agencies. On 13 March 2018 it was again dissolved and merged into the National Supervisory Commission.

The Minister of Supervision usually also serves as the Deputy Secretary of the Central Commission for Discipline Inspection of the Communist Party.

Ministers

See also 
 Corruption in China
 Central Commission for Discipline Inspection of the Chinese Communist Party
 National Supervisory Commission of the People's Republic of China
 Ministries of the People's Republic of China

References 

Supervision
Anti-corruption agencies
China, Supervision
China, Supervision
China, Supervision
China, Supervision
1954 establishments in China
1959 disestablishments in China
1987 establishments in China
2018 disestablishments in China